This is a list of every Georgia Tech Yellow Jackets football team quarterback and the years they participated on the Georgia Tech Yellow Jackets football team. Georgia Tech quarterbacks have led Georgia Tech to 673 wins, 37 bowl games, and 4 National Championships. Two quarterbacks have received Heisman Trophy votes and one of the quarterbacks, Billy Lothridge, received votes in multiple years.

Nine Georgia Tech quarterbacks have been taken in the National Football League draft since 1936. Including the NFL, Georgia Tech quarterbacks have also played professionally in the Arena Football League, Canadian Football League, World Football League, and American Football League. Three former Georgia Tech quarterbacks went on to be head coaches in Division I-A or professional football.

Georgia Tech quarterbacks have played prominent roles in American society off the gridiron as well. Froggie Morrison, the starting quarterback for the 222-0 game, served in World War I after graduating in 1916. Pat McHugh graduated in 1942, fought in World War II, and returned in 1946 to be drafted by the Philadelphia Eagles. Eddie McAshan became the first African American to start at quarterback for a major Southeastern university during the peak of the Civil Rights Movement.

Four Georgia Tech quarterbacks transferred from other universities and won starting jobs at Georgia Tech. Of the four, two men transferred from archrival University of Georgia and ironically defeated the Bulldogs three times in four meetings including the very first contest of Clean, Old-Fashioned Hate. In the 2008 college football season, five different current or former Yellow Jacket quarterbacks started for three different Division I-A football teams including Georgia Tech.

Main starting quarterbacks

1979 to present

The following quarterbacks were the leading passer for the Yellow Jackets each season since joining the Atlantic Coast Conference in 1979.

1964 to 1978

The following quarterbacks were the leading passer for the Yellow Jackets each season the team was a non-conference independent team, following their withdrawal from the Southeastern Conference.

1933 to 1964

The following quarterbacks were the leading passer for the Yellow Jackets each season the team was a member of the Southeastern Conference.

1922 to 1932

The following quarterbacks were the predominant quarters for the Yellow Jackets each season the team was a member of the Southern Conference.

1896 to 1921 (incomplete)

The following players were the leading quarters for the Yellow Jackets each season the team was a member of the Southern Intercollegiate Athletic Association.

1892 to 1894
The following players were the predominant quarters for the Yellow Jackets each season the team was a non-conference independent team, following the birth of Georgia Tech football.

Other starting quarterbacks
These are quarterbacks that started a few games in the season for special cases and were not the statistical passing leader for the season.  Most of these quarterbacks went on to start the following year or were primary backups throughout their careers.

Other quarterbacks
These are players that departed Georgia Tech and played prominent roles in other teams' successes or played quarterback as a second position at Georgia Tech.

See also
 List of Georgia Institute of Technology alumni

References

Georgia Tech Yellow Jackets

Georgia Tech Yellow Jackets starting quarterbacks